El desconocido may refer to:

 Retribution (2015 film) ("The stranger") a 2015 Spanish action thriller film
 The Unknown Hitman: The Story of El Cholo Adrián a 2017-2019 Mexican crime drama television series